The discography of Holly Valance, an Australian singer, consists of two studio albums, four singles, four music videos and other album appearances.

Studio albums

Singles

As lead artist

Guest appearances

Music videos

Guest appearances

References

Pop music discographies
Discographies of Australian artists